St. Leo's College is a girls secondary school in Carlow, County Carlow, Ireland that was founded by the Sisters of Mercy in 1839.

Notable alumni 
 Olivia O'Leary, journalist, writer and current affairs presenter
 Kathryn Thomas, TV presenter

External links

References 

Buildings and structures in Carlow (town)
Education in Carlow (town)
Girls' schools in the Republic of Ireland
Secondary schools in County Carlow
Sisters of Mercy schools
Educational institutions established in 1839
1839 establishments in Ireland